María José López Herrera (born 9 October 1984) is a Mexican former professional tennis player.

Born in San Luis Potosí, López Herrera was a world No. 18 junior and a girls' doubles semifinalist at Wimbledon.

López Herrera, who represented Mexico in the Fed Cup in 2001 and 2002, had two main-draw appearances as a wildcard at the WTA Tour's Mexican Open. She fell in the first round on both occasions.

ITF finals

Singles (0–1)

Doubles (1–0)

References

External links
 
 
 

1984 births
Living people
Mexican female tennis players
Sportspeople from San Luis Potosí
20th-century Mexican women
21st-century Mexican women